Werner Janik (15 April 1920 – 7 August 2003) was a German footballer. He played in seven matches for the Poland national football team from 1947 to 1948.

References

External links
 

1920 births
2003 deaths
Polish footballers
Poland international footballers
Place of birth missing
Association footballers not categorized by position